Bud Shank Plays Music from Today's Movies is an album by saxophonist Bud Shank recorded in 1967 for the World Pacific label.

Reception

AllMusic rated the album with 3 stars.

Track listing
 "Theme from Warning Shot" (Jerry Goldsmith) - 2:00
 "Georgy Girl" (Tom Springfield, Jim Dale) - 2:51
 "Any Wednesday" (Alan Bergman, Marilyn Bergman, George Duning) - 2:32
 "Watch What Happens" (Michel Legrand, Norman Gimbel) - 2:58
 "Two Weeks in September" (Frank Lake, Thomas Kaye) - 3:41
 "Venice After Dark" (Lalo Schifrin) - 2:16
 "The Pin" (Schifrin) - 2:32
 "Love Is Stronger Then We (Plus Fort Que Nous)" (Francis Lai, Pierre Barouh, Jerry Keller) - 2:42
 "Luv" (Gerry Mulligan) - 2:26
 "Theme from "The Sand Pebbles" (And We Were Lovers)" (Goldsmith) - 2:52
 "This Year" (Johnny Keating, (Johnnny Worth) - 2:53
 "Hurry Sundown" (Hugo Montenegro, Buddy Kaye) - 2:29

Personnel 
Bud Shank - alto saxophone
Jimmy Zito - flugelhorn
Mike Melvoin - organ, harpsichord
Dennis Budimir, Herb Ellis - guitar
Ray Brown - bass
Frank Capp - drums
Victor Feldman - vibraphone, percussion
Unidentified orchestra arranged and conducted by Bob Florence

References 

1967 albums
World Pacific Records albums
Bud Shank albums
Albums arranged by Bob Florence
Albums conducted by Bob Florence